The 2021 Championship League Invitational was a professional non-ranking snooker tournament, that took place from   in the Ballroom, Stadium MK in Milton Keynes, England. It is the 16th staging of the tournament.

On the first day of the tournament Stuart Bingham made the eighth career maximum break. He accomplished the feat in the second frame of his Group 1 win over Thepchaiya Un-Nooh.

Kyren Wilson was the defending champion, having defeated Judd Trump 3–1 in the final of the ranking edition of the tournament.

Wilson successfully defended the title, coming from 0–2 down in his last Winners group game, the semi-final and the final to win all three matches 3–2. He defeated Mark Williams 3–2 in the final to win the tournament.

Tournament format 
The Championship League event sees 25 professionals take part, with players earning prize money for every frame won. Matches are best of five frames, and the league is played from January to April 2021.

The competition runs over eight groups, each consisting of seven players. From each group the top four qualify for a play-off, and the winners of the first seven play-offs qualify for the winners group. The bottom two players of each group are eliminated and the remaining four move to the next group, where they are joined by three more players until the seventh group. The winners play in the final group, and the winner of the Winners' Group play-off takes the title and a place at the 2021 Champion of Champions.

Prize fund 
The breakdown of prize money for the 2021 Championship League is shown below.

Groups 1–7
Winner: £3,000
Runner-up: £2,000
Semi-final: £1,000
Frame-win (league stage): £100
Frame-win (play-offs): £300
Highest break: £500

Winners' Group
Winner: £10,000
Runner-up: £5,000
Semi-final: £3,000
Frame-win (league stage): £200
Frame-win (play-offs): £300
Highest break: £1,000

Tournament total: £182,700

Group 1 
Group 1 was played on 4 and 5 January 2021. Zhou Yuelong won the group and qualified for the Winners' Group.

Matches 

 John Higgins 3–2 Stuart Bingham
 Michael Holt 1–3 Thepchaiya Un-Nooh
 John Higgins 3–0 Gary Wilson
 Zhou Yuelong 2–3 Graeme Dott
 Stuart Bingham 3–2 Michael Holt
 Gary Wilson 2–3 Graeme Dott
 John Higgins 3–1 Michael Holt
 Thepchaiya Un-Nooh 2–3 Zhou Yuelong
 Michael Holt 1–3 Gary Wilson
 Stuart Bingham 3–0 Thepchaiya Un-Nooh
 Gary Wilson 3–2 Zhou Yuelong
 John Higgins 3–2 Graeme Dott
 Thepchaiya Un-Nooh 2–3 Graeme Dott
 Stuart Bingham 2–3 Zhou Yuelong
 Thepchaiya Un-Nooh 3–2 Gary Wilson
 Michael Holt 0–3 Zhou Yuelong
 Stuart Bingham 3–2 Gary Wilson
 Michael Holt 1–3 Graeme Dott
 John Higgins 0–3 Zhou Yuelong
 Stuart Bingham 3–1 Graeme Dott
 John Higgins 3–0 Thepchaiya Un-Nooh

Table

Play-offs

Group 2 
Group 2 was played on 6 and 7 January 2021. Graeme Dott won the group and qualified for the Winners' Group.

Matches 

 Kyren Wilson 3–1 Scott Donaldson
 Matthew Selt 3–1 Gary Wilson
 Kyren Wilson 0–3 Graeme Dott
 Stuart Bingham 2–3 John Higgins
 Matthew Selt 1–3 Scott Donaldson
 Graeme Dott 2–3 John Higgins
 Kyren Wilson 1–3 Matthew Selt
 Gary Wilson 3–1 Stuart Bingham
 Matthew Selt 3–1 Graeme Dott
 Scott Donaldson 3–0 Gary Wilson
 Graeme Dott 3–2 Stuart Bingham
 Kyren Wilson 2–3 John Higgins
 Gary Wilson 1–3 John Higgins
 Scott Donaldson 3–1 Stuart Bingham
 Gary Wilson 1–3 Graeme Dott
 Matthew Selt 1–3 Stuart Bingham
 Scott Donaldson 3–2 Graeme Dott
 Matthew Selt 3–0 John Higgins
 Kyren Wilson 3–2 Stuart Bingham
 Kyren Wilson 2–3 Gary Wilson
 Scott Donaldson 1–3 John Higgins

Table

Play-offs

Group 3 
Group 3 was played on 8 and 9 January 2021. John Higgins won the group and qualified for the Winners' Group.

Matches 

 Mark Selby 3–1 Zhao Xintong
 Tom Ford 1–3 Kyren Wilson
 Zhao Xintong 3–2 John Higgins
 Matthew Selt 0–3 Scott Donaldson
 Mark Selby 0–3 Tom Ford
 John Higgins 3–1 Scott Donaldson
 Zhao Xintong 2–3 Tom Ford
 Kyren Wilson 3–2 Matthew Selt
 Tom Ford 2–3 John Higgins
 Mark Selby 3–0 Kyren Wilson
 John Higgins 3–0 Matthew Selt
 Zhao Xintong 3–2 Scott Donaldson
 Kyren Wilson 3–2 Scott Donaldson
 Mark Selby 0–3 Matthew Selt
 Kyren Wilson 1–3 John Higgins
 Tom Ford 0–3 Matthew Selt
 Mark Selby 3–2 John Higgins
 Tom Ford 3–1 Scott Donaldson
 Zhao Xintong 3–2 Matthew Selt
 Mark Selby 2–3 Scott Donaldson
 Zhao Xintong 1–3 Kyren Wilson

Table

Play-offs

Group 4 
Group 4 was played on 8 and 9 February 2021. Judd Trump won the group and qualified for the Winners' Group.

Matches 

 Judd Trump 3–0 Mark Williams
 Mark Selby 3–1 Jack Lisowski
 Judd Trump 3–2 Tom Ford
 Kyren Wilson 3–1 Barry Hawkins
 Jack Lisowski 1–3 Mark Williams
 Kyren Wilson 2–3 Tom Ford
 Judd Trump 2–3 Jack Lisowski
 Mark Selby 0–3 Barry Hawkins
 Jack Lisowski 0–3 Tom Ford
 Mark Selby 3–2 Mark Williams
 Barry Hawkins 3–2 Tom Ford
 Judd Trump 1–3 Kyren Wilson
 Mark Selby 3–0 Kyren Wilson
 Mark Williams 1–3 Barry Hawkins
 Mark Selby 3–1 Tom Ford
 Jack Lisowski 3–1 Barry Hawkins
 Mark Williams 3–2 Tom Ford
 Kyren Wilson 3–0 Jack Lisowski
 Judd Trump 3–0 Barry Hawkins
 Kyren Wilson 0–3 Mark Williams
 Judd Trump 3–0 Mark Selby

Note
Zhao Xintong, who had qualified from group 3, withdrew from the tournament prior to group 4 play.

Table

Play-offs

Group 5 
Group 5 was played on 10 and 11 February 2021. Kyren Wilson won the group and qualified for the Winners' Group.

Matches 

 Ronnie O'Sullivan 3–0 Joe Perry
 Barry Hawkins 1–3 Ali Carter
 Ronnie O'Sullivan 3–0 Kyren Wilson
 Mark Selby 2–3 Mark Williams
 Joe Perry 2–3 Ali Carter
 Mark Selby 2–3 Kyren Wilson
 Mark Williams 3–1 Barry Hawkins
 Ronnie O'Sullivan 3–1 Ali Carter
 Barry Hawkins 1–3 Joe Perry
 Kyren Wilson 1–3 Ali Carter
 Ronnie O'Sullivan 3–1 Mark Selby
 Kyren Wilson 3–2 Mark Williams
 Mark Selby 2–3 Barry Hawkins
 Mark Williams 0–3 Joe Perry
 Kyren Wilson 3–1 Barry Hawkins
 Mark Williams 1–3 Ali Carter
 Kyren Wilson 3–2 Joe Perry
 Mark Selby 0–3 Ali Carter
 Ronnie O'Sullivan 1–3 Mark Williams
 Mark Selby 3–1 Joe Perry
 Ronnie O'Sullivan 1–3 Barry Hawkins

Table

Play-offs

Group 6 
Group 6 was played on 12 and 13 February 2021. Ali Carter won the group and qualified for the Winners' Group.

Matches 

 David Gilbert 3–0 Liang Wenbo
 Anthony McGill 3–2 Joe Perry
 Liang Wenbo 2–3 Li Hang
 Mark Williams 0–3 Ali Carter
 David Gilbert 2–3 Anthony McGill
 Mark Williams 3–1 Li Hang
 Anthony McGill 1–3 Liang Wenbo
 Joe Perry 0–3 Ali Carter
 Anthony McGill 3–1 Li Hang
 David Gilbert 3–2 Joe Perry
 Ali Carter 3–1 Li Hang
 Mark Williams 3–2 Liang Wenbo
 Mark Williams 0–3 Joe Perry
 David Gilbert 0–3 Ali Carter
 Joe Perry 3–1 Li Hang
 Anthony McGill 3–2 Ali Carter
 David Gilbert 3–2 Li Hang
 Mark Williams 2–3 Anthony McGill
 Ali Carter 3–2 Liang Wenbo
 Mark Williams 3–1 David Gilbert
 Joe Perry 2–3 Liang Wenbo

Note
Ronnie O'Sullivan, who had qualified from group 5, withdrew from the tournament prior to group 6 play.

Table

Play-offs

Group 7 
Group 7 was played on 30 and 31 March 2021. Mark Williams won the group and qualified for the Winners' Group.

Matches 

 Yan Bingtao 3–1 Kurt Maflin
 Neil Robertson 1–3 Joe Perry
 Mark Williams 3–1 Kurt Maflin
 David Gilbert 3–1 Anthony McGill
 Neil Robertson 2–3 Yan Bingtao
 Mark Williams 2–3 Anthony McGill
 Neil Robertson 3–2 Kurt Maflin
 David Gilbert 3–2 Joe Perry
 Neil Robertson 0–3 Mark Williams
 Yan Bingtao 3–1 Joe Perry
 Mark Williams 3–1 David Gilbert
 Anthony McGill 3–1 Kurt Maflin
 Anthony McGill 1–3 Joe Perry
 Yan Bingtao 3–1 David Gilbert
 Mark Williams 3–2 Joe Perry
 Neil Robertson 2–3 David Gilbert
 Yan Bingtao 3–1 Mark Williams
 Neil Robertson 1–3 Anthony McGill
 David Gilbert 3–0 Kurt Maflin
 Yan Bingtao 3–1 Anthony McGill
 Joe Perry 3–2 Kurt Maflin

Table

Play-offs

Winners' Group 
The Winners' Group was played on 1 and 2 April 2021. Kyren Wilson defended his Championship League title, defeating Mark Williams 3–2 in the final.

Matches 

 Judd Trump 1–3 Zhou Yuelong
 John Higgins 3–1 Mark Williams
 Zhou Yuelong 2–3 Graeme Dott
 Kyren Wilson 1–3 Ali Carter
 John Higgins 3–1 Graeme Dott
 Judd Trump 3–0 Ali Carter
 John Higgins 3–0 Zhou Yuelong
 Kyren Wilson 3–2 Mark Williams
 Judd Trump 3–1 John Higgins
 Mark Williams 2–3 Graeme Dott
 Judd Trump 2–3 Kyren Wilson
 Zhou Yuelong 1–3 Ali Carter
 Mark Williams 3–1 Ali Carter
 Kyren Wilson 2–3 Graeme Dott
 Judd Trump 1–3 Mark Williams
 John Higgins 3–0 Kyren Wilson
 Judd Trump 0–3 Graeme Dott
 John Higgins 3–0 Ali Carter
 Kyren Wilson 3–2 Zhou Yuelong
 Graeme Dott 3–0 Ali Carter
 Mark Williams 3–1 Zhou Yuelong

Table

Play-offs

Century breaks 
Total: A total of 147 century breaks were made during the tournament.

 147 (1), 136, 132, 127, 112  Stuart Bingham
 144 (5), 137, 137, 133, 109, 108, 101  Mark Selby
 144 (3), 110, 104, 100  Zhao Xintong
 143 (W), 142, 142, 136, 135, 133, 132, 130, 129, 128, 126, 126, 124, 123, 121, 116, 113, 110, 107, 105, 103, 100, 100  Kyren Wilson
 143 (2), 138, 103  Gary Wilson
 142 (4), 131, 131, 113, 101  Tom Ford
 142, 104, 104  Matthew Selt
 141, 135, 106, 103  Graeme Dott
 141, 115, 111, 109, 106, 104, 102  Ali Carter
 140, 132, 125, 124, 122, 114, 102  Ronnie O'Sullivan
 139 (7), 138 (6), 134, 133, 131, 127, 127, 122, 120, 114, 114, 110, 108, 106, 106, 105, 103, 102  Mark Williams
 138, 137, 131, 131, 120, 116, 115, 108, 102, 102, 100  Judd Trump
 137, 131, 127, 119, 112, 112, 105, 105, 104, 103, 101, 100  John Higgins
 133, 118, 111, 105, 105, 101, 100  David Gilbert
 133  Kurt Maflin
 131, 131, 125, 113, 110  Zhou Yuelong
 130, 122, 103  Scott Donaldson
 128, 125  Yan Bingtao
 123, 116, 113, 110, 109, 101  Anthony McGill
 120, 114, 109, 107  Joe Perry
 114  Barry Hawkins
 107, 106, 105, 105  Thepchaiya Un-Nooh
 105, 104, 100, 100  Neil Robertson
 104  Jack Lisowski

Bold: highest break in the indicated group.

Winnings 

Green: won the group. Bold: highest break in the group. All prize money in GBP.
Parenthesis: World rankings prior to tournament start, 4 January 2021.
Notes
(a) Zhao Xintong withdrew from the tournament prior to group 4 play.
(b) Ronnie O'Sullivan withdrew from the tournament prior to group 6 play.

References

External links 
 Matchroom Sport Championship League Snooker
 World Snooker Calendar 2020/2021 

2021
2021 in snooker
2021 in English sport
January 2021 sports events in the United Kingdom
February 2021 sports events in the United Kingdom
March 2021 sports events in the United Kingdom
April 2021 sports events in the United Kingdom